Noble George "Dodo" Armstrong (June 3, 1924 – July 24, 1993) was an American professional baseball player, a catcher whose nine-season (1943–1951) career included eight games played in the Major Leagues for the  Philadelphia Athletics. The native of Orange, New Jersey, threw and batted right-handed.

Apart from those eight games in the Majors, and 15 games played for the 1946 Savannah Indians of the Class A Sally League, Armstrong's professional career took place at the Class B level, or lower, of minor league baseball. His only MLB hit, a double, came in his first big-league at bat as a pinch hitter against Dave Ferriss of the Boston Red Sox at Shibe Park on April 26, 1946.  During his debut, Armstrong relieved starting catcher Gene Desautels and stayed in the game to record three errorless chances in the field.  In his subsequent seven games in the Majors, he was hitless in five more at bats, with one base on balls, before returning to the minor leagues in midseason.

References

External links

1924 births
1993 deaths
Baseball players from New Jersey
Drummondville Cubs players
Jamestown Falcons players
Lancaster Red Roses players
Major League Baseball catchers
People from Orange, New Jersey
Philadelphia Athletics players
Savannah Indians players
Sportspeople from Essex County, New Jersey
Sunbury Reds players
Tampa Smokers players
York White Roses players